The 41st Army Corps was an Army corps in the Imperial Russian Army.

1915-16
9th Army

1916-17
As part of the 7th Army the 41st Corps took part in the Kerensky Offensive. Although they consisted of seven divisions rather than the standard four, they were however significantly understrength as the average strength of the rifle the rifle companies was 80 as opposed to the nominal 250 on account of mass desertions.
Their divisions consisted of:
 113th Division
 5th Trans-Amur Division
 3rd Trans-Amur Division
 74th Siberian Division
Reserves:
 23rd Division
 108th Division
 Polish Division

References

Corps of the Russian Empire